Eckenrode is a surname. Notable people with the surname include:

Evan Eckenrode (born 1997), American comedian, filmmaker, internet personality and former Vine star
Jannik Eckenrode (born 1993), American professional soccer player
Lars Eckenrode (born 1995), American professional soccer player